Wicked is the first single from rapper Ice Cube's third studio album The Predator. The additional vocals were performed by Don Jagwarr. The song's music video was directed by Marcus Raboy and features Anthony Kiedis and Flea of the Red Hot Chili Peppers. It is Ice Cube's first single to enter the Billboard Hot 100, peaking at number 55.

Cover versions
The song was covered by Korn for their 1996 album Life Is Peachy. This version features Deftones lead singer Chino Moreno and contrasts from Ice Cube's version with scat-like vocals from Jonathan Davis in the chorus. This would be the first of four Korn songs involving Ice Cube (and vice versa), the others being "Children of the Korn", "Fuck Dying" and "Should I Stay or Should I Go".

In 1996, the song was covered by Calla Destra for the electro-industrial various artists compilation Operation Beatbox.

Limp Bizkit has also covered the song in concert, while Korn have performed this song live on several occasions with Deftones frontman Chino Moreno, Limp Bizkit frontman Fred Durst and Ice Cube himself (along with "Children of the Korn").

Track listing
 "Wicked" (radio version)
 "Wicked" (instrumental)
 "U Ain't Gonna Take My Life"
 "U Ain't Gonna Take My Life" (instrumental)
 "Wicked" (LP version)

Charts

Weekly charts

Certifications

References

Ice Cube songs
1992 singles
1992 songs
Music videos directed by Marcus Raboy
Songs written by Ice Cube